Elections in Hawaii are held for various local, state, and federal seats in the state of Hawaii. Regular elections are held every even year, although special elections may be held to fill vacancies at other points in time. The primary election is held on the second Saturday in August, while the general election is held on Election Day, which is the first Tuesday after the first Monday in November.

In a 2020 study, Hawaii was ranked as the 6th easiest state for citizens to vote in.

Elected offices

Federal
Hawaii participates in federal elections along with every other state in the United States. The state votes on electors for president and vice president, as well as legislators to represent it in Congress.

President and Vice President

Since its admission in 1959, Hawaii has participated in 16 indirect presidential elections which have been held every four years since 1960. The state is currently delegated four electors to the Electoral College which has remained unchanged since 1964. Candidates for president and vice president are listed on the ballot either as nominees of a qualified political party, or as a petitioned candidate who represents an unqualified party or group.

Senate

Hawaii is represented in the United States Senate by two senators. They are elected to six-year terms through statewide elections with candidates nominated by political parties through partisan primary elections. Mazie Hirono and Brian Schatz serve as the state's current senators. Hirono was last elected in 2018 and is up for re-election in 2024, while Schatz was last elected in 2022 and is up for re-election in 2028.

House of Representatives

Additionally, Hawaii is represented in the United States House of Representatives by two members of Congress, whom are elected in the two congressional districts to two-year terms. The districts are reapportioned every ten years following the release of a new census. They were last elected in 2022 and are both up for re-election in 2024.

State
Hawaii also holds elections for its own state government.

Governor and Lieutenant Governor
The governor and lieutenant governor are the only statewide elected executive offices. Candidates for both offices are nominated in separate primary elections and run as a party-nominated ticket in the general election. They are elected to four-year terms and are limited from serving more than two consecutive terms, although a governor is eligible for re-election if they were out of office for at least one election cycle. The current governor is Josh Green, serving with lieutenant governor Sylvia Luke. They were elected in 2022. Green is eligible for reelection in 2026.

Senate
All twenty-five members of the Hawaii Senate are elected in single-member constituent districts. The senate follows a 2-4-4 term system; every ten years, senators are elected to two-year terms, while the next four elections are held for four-year terms in half of the senate's seats. The current composition of the senate was elected in 2018 and 2020; all seats will be up for election in 2022.

House of Representatives
All fifty-one members of the Hawaii House of Representatives are elected to two-year terms in single-member constituent districts. The current composition of the house was elected in 2020; all seats will be up for election in 2022.

Political parties
There are six registered political parties in Hawaii:
 Aloha ʻĀina Party (A)
 Constitution Party of Hawaii (C)
 Democratic Party of Hawaii (D)
 Green Party of Hawaii (G)
 Libertarian Party of Hawaii (L)
 Hawaii Republican Party (R)

To a political party to qualify, it must petition for signatures of at least 0.1% of total registered voters as of the previous general election. The petition is due 170 days before the primary election. For a registered party to remain qualified, it must have run a candidate in the previous general election for any statewide office or U.S. Representative seat whose incumbent was either barred from or chose not to run for re-election. Additionally, the party must have satisfied at least one of the following requirements in the previous election:
 Received at least 10% of the vote in any statewide or U.S. Representative election.
 Received at least 4% of the total vote of all state senate elections.
 Received at least 4% of the total vote of all state representative elections.
 Received at least 2% of the total vote of all state senate and state representative elections.

Nonpartisan candidates
Hawaii is unique in that it is the only state in the country in which independent or candidates run in a primary election to qualify as the sole Nonpartisan candidate in the general election. To appear on the ballot, these candidates must either receive 10% of the total primary votes for the office, or receive more votes than the lowest vote received by a partisan candidate.

List of recent elections

2022
2022 United States Senate election in Hawaii
2022 United States House of Representatives elections in Hawaii
2022 Hawaii gubernatorial election
2022 Hawaii Senate election
2022 Hawaii House of Representatives election

2020

2020 United States presidential election in Hawaii
2020 Hawaii Democratic presidential primary
2020 United States House of Representatives elections in Hawaii
2020 Hawaii Senate election
2020 Hawaii House of Representatives election
2020 Honolulu mayoral election

2018
2018 United States Senate election in Hawaii
2018 United States House of Representatives elections in Hawaii
2018 Hawaii gubernatorial election
2018 Hawaii Senate election
2018 Hawaii House of Representatives election

2016
2016 United States presidential election in Hawaii
2016 Hawaii Democratic presidential caucuses
2016 United States Senate election in Hawaii
2016 United States House of Representatives elections in Hawaii
2016 Hawaii's 1st congressional district special election
2016 Hawaii Senate election
2016 Honolulu mayoral election

2014
2014 United States Senate special election in Hawaii
2014 United States House of Representatives elections in Hawaii
2014 Hawaii gubernatorial election
2014 Hawaii Senate election

2012

2012 United States presidential election in Hawaii
2012 United States Senate election in Hawaii
2012 United States House of Representatives elections in Hawaii
2012 Hawaii Senate election
2012 Hawaii House of Representatives election
2012 Honolulu mayoral election

See also
Women's suffrage in Hawaii
Political party strength in Hawaii

References

External links
Hawaii Office of Elections official website

 
 
  (State affiliate of the U.S. League of Women Voters)
 

Political events in Hawaii
Government of Hawaii